Ravi Pandit is an Indian businessman and the co-founder and chairman of KPIT Technologies.

Early life and career
Pandit was born to an affluent Marathi family in Pune, Maharashtra, India. Pandit earned his master's degree in Management from MIT Sloan School of Management. He is a fellow member of the Institute of Chartered Accountants of India and an associate member of the Institute of Cost Accountants of India. He was the President of the Mahratta Chamber of Commerce, Industries and Agriculture during 2004–2006.

Pandit has promoted the "Zero Garbage Project" in Pune, partnering with Pune Municipal Corporation through Janwani foundation for which he is the member of Board of trustees.

Publications

References

External links

Living people
Indian billionaires
Businesspeople from Pune
Indian Hindus
Marathi people
Indian industrialists
Businesspeople from Maharashtra
Year of birth missing (living people)